Oumar Dieng (born 30 December 1972) is a former professional footballer. He played for the France olympic team as a defender during the 1993 Mediterranean Games.

Club career
Born in Dakar, Dieng began playing youth football with ASC Jeanne d'Arc. The defender moved to France at age 15, and signed with Lille OSC after being recommended by Bernard Lama. He made his Ligue 1 debut with Lille in 1989. After a few matches with the first team, he went on loan to CS Louhans-Cuiseaux for one season. Dieng would return to Lille until he transferred to Paris Saint-Germain in 1996.

Dieng spent most of his career in France's Ligue 1, but also played for Sampdoria in Italy's Serie A, Çaykur Rizespor, Trabzonspor and Konyaspor in the Turkish Super Lig, and with Kavala F.C. in the Greek Super League.

International career
Dieng played for France at the 1996 Summer Olympics in Atlanta.

Honours

Club
Trabzonspor
Turkish Cup: 2002–03

References

1972 births
Living people
French footballers
Senegalese footballers
Footballers from Dakar
Senegalese emigrants to France
Association football defenders
France under-21 international footballers
Olympic footballers of France
Footballers at the 1996 Summer Olympics
Competitors at the 1993 Mediterranean Games
Mediterranean Games bronze medalists for France
ASC Jeanne d'Arc players
Lille OSC players
Louhans-Cuiseaux FC players
Paris Saint-Germain F.C. players
U.C. Sampdoria players
AJ Auxerre players
CS Sedan Ardennes players
Trabzonspor footballers
Konyaspor footballers
Çaykur Rizespor footballers
A.P.O. Akratitos Ano Liosia players
Kavala F.C. players
Ligue 1 players
Serie A players
Süper Lig players
Super League Greece players
Expatriate footballers in Turkey
Senegalese expatriate sportspeople in Italy
Expatriate footballers in Greece
Expatriate footballers in Italy
French expatriate footballers
French expatriate sportspeople in Italy
French expatriate sportspeople in Greece
French expatriate sportspeople in Turkey
Mediterranean Games medalists in football